The 1911–12 Dartmouth men's ice hockey season was the 7th season of play for the program.

Season
The continued instability with the head coach didn't help the Greens as they suffered the worst loss in program history to Princeton. The never properly recovered and finished the season without a win for the only time in school history (as of 2020).

Note: Dartmouth College did not possess a moniker for its athletic teams until the 1920s, however, the university had adopted 'Dartmouth Green' as its school color in 1866.

Roster

Standings

Schedule and Results

|-
!colspan=12 style=";" | Regular Season

References

Dartmouth Big Green men's ice hockey seasons
Dartmouth
Dartmouth
Dartmouth
Dartmouth